Keith Scott Besomo (born 8 June 1953) was a rugby union player who represented Australia.

Besomo, a lock, was born deaf in Sydney and claimed 1 international rugby cap for Australia. He later in 2010 traveled by pushbike from Perth to Sydney, Australia.

References

Australian rugby union players
Australia international rugby union players
1953 births
Living people
Rugby union players from Sydney
Rugby union locks